The Pinnacle at Symphony Place is a 29-story, office and retail skyscraper located in Nashville, Tennessee, in the city's SoBro (South of Broadway) district. Located adjacent to the Schermerhorn Symphony Center, the building officially opened on February 10, 2010.

The Pinnacle is home to Nashville-based Pinnacle Financial Partners, as well as several law firms. It is the first office tower in downtown Nashville to gain Gold LEED Certification due to its energy-efficient design. The building features a one-acre green roof terrace garden over the parking garage and other environmentally friendly amenities.

The tower was designed by Pickard Chilton of New Haven, Connecticut, and Everton Oglesby of Nashville. According to architect Jon Pickard, the tower's exterior design "takes its inspiration from the timeless design of classic skyscrapers."

On June 17, 2021, Pinnacle announced plans to move to a new headquarters building.

See also
List of tallest buildings in Nashville

References

External links

Emporis listing

Skyscraper office buildings in Nashville, Tennessee
Office buildings completed in 2009